Alfredo Varelli (born Alfredo Ciavarella, 31 August 1914, date of death unknown) was an Italian film actor whose career spanned more than six decades. Varelli was born Alfredo Ciavarella and debuted in Alessandro Blasetti's 1934 film Vecchia guardia. He emerged during the Fascist era, but most of his work was post-Second World War. He played a leading role in the 1942 historical drama The Jester's Supper. Varelli is also known for playing "Lucan" in Quo Vadis (1951). His last role was in the film Roseanna's Grave (1997).

Selected filmography
 Vecchia guardia (1934)
 Giuseppe Verdi (1938)
 I, His Father (1939)
 The Secret Lover (1941)
 Fedora (1942)
 The Jester's Supper (1942)
 Measure for Measure (1943)
 The Tyrant of Padua (1946)
 The Devil's Gondola (1946)
 The Beggar's Daughter (1950)
 Cavalcade of Heroes (1950)
 Quo Vadis (1951) as Lucan, poet in Nero's court [dubbed]
 The Barbarians (1953)
 Tripoli, Beautiful Land of Love (1954)
 The Siege of Syracuse (1960)
 The Giants of Thessaly (1960)
 Colossus and the Amazon Queen (1960)
 Pontius Pilate (1962)
 Spartacus and the Ten Gladiators (1964)
 Seven Dollars on the Red (1966)
 Assassination (1967)
  Roseanna's Grave (1997)

References

Bibliography
 Reich, Jacqueline & Garofalo, Piero. Re-viewing Fascism: Italian Cinema, 1922-1943. Indiana University Press, 2002.

External links

1914 births
Year of death missing
Italian male film actors
People from Lazio